Mahhi Vij (born 1 April 1982)  is an Indian model and actress who appears on Hindi television. She is known for playing the role of Nakusha in Laagi Tujhse Lagan and Nandini in Balika Vadhu. Vij and her husband Jay Bhanushali won the dance reality show Nach Baliye 5 in 2013. She was also a contestant on Jhalak Dikhhla Jaa 4 and Fear Factor: Khatron Ke Khiladi 7.

Career
Vij moved to Mumbai at the age of 17 and started her career in modelling. She has appeared in numerous music videos including Tu, Tu Hai Wahi (DJ Aqeel Mix). She was the supporting female lead in the TV series Akela in 2006.

Her first film was in Malayalam alongside Malayalam star Mammootty which was titled Aparichithan.

She played the lead role of Pratha in the Sahara One show Shubh Kadam. Her breakthrough role was that of protagonist Nakusha in the television show Laagi Tujhse Lagan on Colors TV, for which she won the Gold Award for Best Actress in a Lead Role in 2011. She was seen in season 4 of Jhalak Dikhhla Jaa as a contestant.

In 2013, she and her husband Jay Bhanushali participated in the dance reality show Nach Baliye 5, which they won. She was one of the contestants of Khatron Ke Khiladi 5, however, she had to opt out due to a leg injury.

Personal life

Vij married Indian television and film actor Jay Bhanushali in 2011. In 2017 they fostered a boy, Rajveer, and a girl, Khushi. The couple's first biological child, a daughter named Tara, was born in 2019.

Filmography

Films

Television

References

External links

 
 

Living people
1982 births
Female models from Delhi
Indian television actresses
Indian film actresses
Actresses in Malayalam cinema
Actresses in Telugu cinema
Nach Baliye winners
Fear Factor: Khatron Ke Khiladi participants